Rockport is a census-designated place (CDP) in Skagit County, Washington, United States. The population was 109 at the 2010 census. It is included in the Mount Vernon–Anacortes, Washington Metropolitan Statistical Area.

Based on per capita income, Rockport ranks 48th of 522 areas in the state of Washington to be ranked.

Geography
Rockport is located at  (48.485606, -121.598145).

According to the United States Census Bureau, the CDP has a total area of 0.4 square miles (1.0 km2), all of it land.

Climate
The climate in this area has mild differences between highs and lows, and there is adequate rainfall year-round.  According to the Köppen Climate Classification system, Rockport has a marine west coast climate, abbreviated "Cfb" on climate maps.

Demographics
As of the census of 2000, there were 102 people, 39 households, and 26 families residing in the CDP. The population density was 272.2 people per square mile (106.4/km2). There were 54 housing units at an average density of 144.1/sq mi (56.3/km2). The racial makeup of the CDP was 98.04% White and 1.96% Native American. Hispanic or Latino of any race were 0.98% of the population.

There were 39 households, out of which 25.6% had children under the age of 18 living with them, 51.3% were married couples living together, 12.8% had a female householder with no husband present, and 33.3% were non-families. 25.6% of all households were made up of individuals, and 2.6% had someone living alone who was 65 years of age or older. The average household size was 2.62 and the average family size was 3.12.

In the CDP, the age distribution of the population shows 30.4% under the age of 18, 7.8% from 18 to 24, 27.5% from 25 to 44, 20.6% from 45 to 64, and 13.7% who were 65 years of age or older. The median age was 34 years. For every 100 females, there were 104.0 males. For every 100 females age 18 and over, there were 102.9 males.

The median income for a household in the CDP was $48,750, and the median income for a family was $69,250. Males had a median income of $36,250 versus $26,250 for females. The per capita income for the CDP was $28,372. None of the population or families were below the poverty line.

References

Census-designated places in Skagit County, Washington
Census-designated places in Washington (state)